George, Crown Prince of Serbia ( / Đorđe Karađorđević; 8 September (O.S. 27 August) 1887 – 17 October 1972), was a Serbian prince, the eldest son of King Peter I and Zorka of Montenegro. He was the older brother of King Alexander I of Yugoslavia.

In 1909, Crown Prince George  killed his servant, and following a negative campaign in the press, he was compelled to give up his claim to the throne. He later served with distinction in the army, was severely wounded during the First World War, and thereby became popular in the country, which aroused the alarm of his younger brother. In 1925, his brother, the King, had him arrested, declared insane, and locked in an asylum. He remained confined there for nearly two decades, until released by the German occupying force during World War II. After that war ended, he was the only member of the royal family not to be sent into exile and declared an enemy of the state.

Early life and background
George was born a member of the House of Karađorđević. His grandfather, Alexander Karađorđević, had briefly ruled the Principality of Serbia during the period 1842–58, but he had been the first and only ruler from the family, which did not otherwise have a royal background. After being deposed in 1858, George's grandfather and his family had had to leave their homeland, and by the time of George's birth, they had been in exile for almost three decades.

George's father, Petar Karađorđević (the future King Peter I of Serbia), had made an advantageous marriage rather late in life with Ljubica (known as Zorka), the eldest daughter of King Nicholas I of Montenegro. After marrying the princess, he made his home in the Principality of Montenegro, and all his children were born there. Thus, George was born in Cetinje and spent the first few years of his life in the court of his maternal grandfather. He was one of five siblings, two of whom died in infancy; he therefore grew up with one older sister, Helen, and one younger brother, Alexander. In March 1890, when George was hardly two years old, his mother died in childbirth. Shortly afterwards, Petar moved his three motherless children first to Geneva (where he had lived in exile before his marriage) and then to Russia. In Russia, George studied at the Page Corps school of Tsar Alexander II.

Crown Prince
In 1903, aged 17, George returned to Serbia along with his family, following a palace coup when a conspiracy of army officers overthrew the ruling Obrenović dynasty to proclaim his father as King of Serbia. As a result, George became Crown Prince.

Renunciation
The Prince had a reputation for being hot-tempered, and on one occasion attacked his tutor, Major Levasseur, who had to be dispatched back to Paris. In 1909 a more serious scandal broke when he killed his valet by kicking him to death.
Although there were moves to cover up the murder, the truth came out, and he had to renounce his succession rights. George tried to recant his renunciation on a number of occasions, but was unsuccessful.

War service and arrest
Prince George participated in the Balkan Wars as well as World War I, where he was severely wounded in the Battle of Mačkov Kamen near Krupanj in 1914. After his father's death and brother Alexander's subsequent coronation, hostilities between the two brothers arose, which led to Prince George's arrest in 1925. He was proclaimed to be insane and locked in an asylum near the city of Niš. Following Alexander's assassination in 1934, George hoped he would be freed by the new regent Prince Paul, but he remained in jail until World War II when he was freed by the German occupiers.

Later life and marriage
After the war the Karađorđević family was declared enemy-of-the-state by Josip Broz Tito's communist regime. However, Prince George was permitted to retire in Belgrade as the only member of the royal family allowed to remain in the country. In 1947, at the age of 60, he married Radmila Radonjić (1907–1993), a member of the Radonjić noble family, who held the hereditary title of guvernadur of Montenegro, granted to them by the Republic of Venice in 1756 and were in constant political opposition and rivalry with George's maternal family, the House of Petrović-Njegoš. The couple did not have any children. He wrote his memoirs Istina o mom životu (Truth About my Life).

He died on 17 October 1972 in Belgrade and was buried in St. George's Church in Topola, SFR Yugoslavia. His death came the day after the tenth anniversary of the death of his sister, Princess Helen of Serbia.

Interest in mathematics

While he was crown prince, George developed a close friendship with the mathematician Mihailo Petrović Alas, who had been retained to tutor him in mathematics. They went fishing together and established a fencing club in Belgrade. This friendship lasted through difficult times later in George's life.

Ancestors

References

Sources
 Clark, C. (2013) The Sleepwalkers. How Europe went to War in 1914, London: Penguin Books.
 Robson, E. & Stedall, J. (2009) The Oxford Handbook of the History of Mathematics OUP: Oxford.

External links
 

1887 births
1972 deaths
People from Cetinje
Yugoslav princes
Serbian princes
Karađorđević dynasty
Heirs apparent who never acceded
Burials at the Mausoleum of the Royal House of Karađorđević, Oplenac
Sons of kings